Yamnoye is the name of several rural localities in Russia:
Yamnoye, Volodarsky District, Astrakhan Oblast, a selo in Volodarsky District, Astrakhan Oblast
Yamnoye, Ikryaninsky District, Astrakhan Oblast, a selo in Ikryaninsky District, Astrakhan Oblast